Franklin Bridge is a bridge in Franklin County, Nebraska. The road bridge was built over the Republican River in 1932 and features Warren pony trusses. In 1935, a flood swept away one truss and one approach span.  The bridge was listed on the National Register of Historic Places in 1992, and was delisted in 2020.

See also 
 List of historic bridges in Nebraska

References

Bridges completed in 1932
Road bridges on the National Register of Historic Places in Nebraska
Buildings and structures in Franklin County, Nebraska
National Register of Historic Places in Franklin County, Nebraska
Warren truss bridges in the United States
Former National Register of Historic Places in Nebraska